Shark Bay (Malgana: Gathaagudu, "two waters") is a World Heritage Site in the Gascoyne region of Western Australia. UNESCO's official listing of Shark Bay as a World Heritage Site reads:

History
The record of Australian Aboriginal occupation of Shark Bay extends to  years BP. At that time most of the area was dry land, rising sea levels flooding Shark Bay between  BP and  BP. A considerable number of aboriginal midden sites have been found, especially on Peron Peninsula and Dirk Hartog Island which provide evidence of some of the foods gathered from the waters and nearby land areas.

An expedition led by Dirk Hartog happened upon the area in 1616, becoming the second group of Europeans known to have visited Australia. (The crew of the Duyfken, under Willem Janszoon, had visited Cape York in 1606). The area was given the name Shark Bay by the English explorer William Dampier, on 7 August 1699. Shark Bay was also visited by Louis Aleno de St Aloüarn in 1772, Nicolas Baudin in 1801 to 1803 and Louis de Freycinet in 1818. Europeans, mostly pastoralists, settled in Shark Bay during the 1860s to 1870s. Pearling developed rapidly from 1870.

Commercial whaling was conducted in the bay in the first half of the 20th century by Norwegian owned factory ships and their catcher vessels. In the late 1930s up to 1,000 humpback whales were taken per season.

The half-dozen small communities making up this population occupy less than 1% of the total area.

Shark Bay World Heritage site 
The World Heritage status of the region was created and negotiated in 1991, the first such site in Western Australia.

Protected areas 
It includes many protected areas and conservation reserves, including Shark Bay Marine Park, Francois Peron National Park, Hamelin Pool Marine Nature Reserve, Zuytdorp Nature Reserve and numerous protected islands. Denham and Useless Loop both fall within the boundary of the site, yet are specifically excluded from it.

Landforms 
It is divided by shallow banks and has many peninsulas and islands. One spectacular segment of cliffs is known as the Zuytdorp Cliffs. The bay is located in the transition zone between three major climatic regions and between two major botanical provinces.

Peron Peninsula divides the bay and is the home of its largest settlements as well as a National Park at the northern end.

Dirk Hartog Island is of historical significance due to landings upon it by early explorers. In 1616, Dirk Hartog landed at Inscription Point on the north end of the island and marked his discovery with a pewter plate, inscribed with the date and nailed to a post. This plate was then replaced by Willem de Vlamingh and returned to the Netherlands. It is now kept in the Rijksmuseum. There is a replica in the Shark Bay Discovery Centre in Denham.

Bernier and Dorre islands in the north-west corner of the heritage area are among the last-remaining habitats of two varieties of Australian mammals, hare-wallabies, threatened with extinction. They are used, with numerous other smaller islands throughout the marine park, to release threatened species that are being bred at Project Eden in François Peron National Park. These islands are free of feral non-native animals which might predate the threatened species, and so provide a safe haven of pristine environment on which to restore species that are threatened on the mainland.

The Australian Wildlife Conservancy is the guardian of Faure Island, off Monkey Mia. Seasonally, sea turtles come here to nest and are the subject of studies conducted in conjunction with the Western Australian Department of Environment and Conservation (DEC) on this sheltered island.

Fauna 
Shark Bay is an area of major zoological importance.  It is home to about 10,000 dugongs ('sea cows'), around 12.5% of the world's population, and there are many Indo-Pacific bottlenose dolphins, particularly at Monkey Mia.  The dolphins here have been particularly friendly since the 1960s. The area supports 26 threatened Australian mammal species, over 230 species of bird, and nearly 150 species of reptile.  It is an important breeding and nursery ground for fish, crustaceans, and coelenterates.  There are over 323 fish species, many of them sharks and rays.

Some bottlenose dolphins in Shark Bay exhibit one of the few known cases of tool use in marine mammals (along with sea otters): they protect their nose with a sponge while foraging for food in the sandy sea bottom. Humpback and southern right whales use the waters of the bay as migratory staging post while other species such as Bryde's whale come into the bay less frequently but to feed or rest. The threatened green and loggerhead sea turtles nest on the bay's sandy beaches. The largest fish in the world, the whale shark, gathers in the bay during the April and May full moons.

Flora 
It includes the  Wooramel Seagrass Bank, the largest seagrass bank in the world and contains a  Posidonia australis meadow formed by a single plant, the largest in the world.

Shark Bay also contains the largest number of seagrass species ever recorded in one place; twelve species have been found, with up to nine occurring together in some places. The seagrasses are a vital part of the complex environment of the bay. Over thousands of years, sediment and shell fragments have accumulated in the seagrasses to form vast expanses of seagrass beds. This has raised the sea floor, making the bay shallower. Seagrasses are the basis of the food chain in Shark Bay, providing home and shelter to various marine species and attracting the dugong population.

In Shark Bay's hot, dry climate, evaporation greatly exceeds the annual precipitation rate. Thus, the seawater in the shallow bays becomes very salt-concentrated, or 'hypersaline'. Seagrasses also restrict the tidal flow of waters through the bay area, preventing the ocean tides from diluting the sea water. The water of the bay is 1.5 to 2 times more salty than the surrounding ocean waters.

Stromatolites 
Based on growth rate it is believed that about 1,000 years ago cyanobacteria (blue-green algae) began building up stromatolites in Hamelin Pool at the Hamelin Station Reserve in the southern part of the bay. These structures are modern equivalents of the earliest signs of life on Earth, with fossilized stromatolites being found dating from 3.5 billion years ago at North Pole near Marble Bar, in Western Australia, and are considered the longest continuing biological lineage. They were first identified in 1956 at Hamelin Pool as a living species, before that only being known in the fossil record. Hamelin Pool contains the most diverse and abundant examples of living stromatolite forms in the world. Other occurrences are found at Lake Clifton near Mandurah and Lake Thetis near Cervantes. It is hypothesized that some stromatolites contain a new form of chlorophyll, chlorophyll f.

Shark Bay World Heritage Discovery Centre 
Facilities around the World Heritage area, provided by the Shire of Shark Bay and the WA Department of Environment and Conservation, include the Shark Bay World Heritage Discovery Centre in Denham which provides interactive displays and comprehensive information about the features of the region.

Access 
Access to Shark Bay is by air via Shark Bay Airport, and by the World Heritage Drive, a 150 km link road between Denham and the Overlander Roadhouse on the North West Coastal Highway.

Specific reserved areas

National parks and reserves in the World Heritage Area 

 Bernier Island
 Dorre Island
 Charlie Island
 Francois Peron National Park
  Friday Island
 Hamelin Pool Marine Nature Reserve
 Hamelin Pool/East Faure Island High-Low Water Mark
 Koks Island
 Monkey Mia
 Shark Bay Marine Park

 Shell Beach
 Small Islands
 Zuytdorp Nature Reserve

Bays of the World Heritage area 
 Hamelin Pool
 Henri Freycinet Harbour
 L'Haridon Bight

Islands of the World Heritage area 
 Bernier Island
 Dirk Hartog Island
 Faure Island

Peninsulas of the World Heritage area 
 Bellefin Prong
 Heirisson Prong
 Carrarang Peninsula
 Peron Peninsula

IBRA sub regions of the Shark Bay Area 
The Shark Bay area has three bioregions within the Interim Biogeographic Regionalisation for Australia (IBRA) system: Carnarvon, Geraldton Sandplains, and Yalgoo. The bioregions are further divided into subbioregions:

 Carnarvon bioregion (CAR) –
 Wooramel sub region (CAR2) – most of Peron Peninsula and coastline east of Hamelin Pool
 Cape Range sub region (CAR1) – (not represented in area)
 Geraldton Sandplains bioregion (GS) –
 Geraldton Hills sub region (GS1) – Zuytdorp Nature Reserve area
 Leseur sub region (GS2) – (not represented in area)
 Yalgoo bioregion (YAL) –
 Tallering sub region (YAL2) (not represented in area)
 Edel subregion (YAL1) – Bernier, Dorre and Dirk Hartog Islands

See also 

 Search for HMAS Sydney and German auxiliary cruiser Kormoran
 List of islands in Shark Bay

References

Further reading

External links 

 Shark Bay, Western Australia UNESCO World Heritage List
 Australian National Heritage Register listing for Shark Bay, Western Australia
 
 Shark Bay Terrestrial Reserves and Proposed Reserve Additions: Management Plan No. 75 2012. Department of Environment and Conservation. 2012.
 Shark Bay World Heritage Discovery Centre
 Shark Bay World Heritage Area
 Shire of Shark Bay

 
World Heritage Sites in Western Australia
Australian National Heritage List
Coastline of Western Australia
IMCRA meso-scale bioregions